Bianca Maria is a feminine given name, a combination of the Italian name Bianca, which means "white" and is a cognate of the medieval name Blanche and of Maria, a Latin form of the Greek name Μαριαμ or Mariam or Maria, found in the New Testament. The combination name Bianca Maria was the name of early queens or noble women such as Bianca Maria Sforza and Bianca Maria Visconti. The name is still well-used in Italy and Romania, among other countries.

Notes

Italian feminine given names
Romanian feminine given names